Joseph John Gerry, O.S.B., (born September 12, 1928) is an American Benedictine monk and prelate of the Roman Catholic Church.

Gerry served as the third abbot of Saint Anselm Abbey until he was appointed as an auxiliary bishop of the Diocese of Manchester in New Hampshire in 1986. He then served as bishop of the Diocese of Portland in Maine from 1989 to 2004.

Early life 
Joseph Gerry was born in Millinocket, Maine on September 12, 1928.  In 1945, he graduated from George W. Stearns High School in Millinocket.  Gerry then entered Saint Anselm College in Goffstown, New Hampshire. Gerry obtained his novitiate at St. Vincent Archabbey in Latrobe, Pennsylvania. On July 2, 1948, Gerry made his profession of religious vows as a monk at St. Anselm Abbey in Manchester, New Hampshire. In 1959, Gerry graduated with a Bachelor of Arts degree from Saint Anselm College.  He then returned to the abbey to complete four more years of theological studies.

Priestly ministry
On June 12, 1954, Gerry was ordained to the priesthood by Bishop Matthew Brady at St. Joseph's Cathedral in Manchester, New Hampshire. In 1955, Gerry earned a Master of Philosophy degree from the University of Toronto.

From 1958 to 1986, Gerry was a professor of philosophy and humanities at Saint Anselm College. In 1959, he received a Doctor of Philosophy degree from Fordham University in New York City. That same year, Gerry was appointed subprior of St. Anselm Abbey.  He was appointed prior in 1963 and on January 6, 1972 was elected abbot. At Saint Anselm College, Gerry also served as academic dean (1971–72) and chancellor (1972–1986).

Episcopal ministry

Auxiliary Bishop of Manchester

On February 4, 1986, Pope John Paul II appointed Gerry as an auxiliary bishop of the Diocese of Manchester and titular bishop of Praecausa.  He received his episcopal consecration on April 21, 1986 from Bishop Odore Gendron, with Bishops Ernest Primeau and Robert Mulvee serving as co-consecrators. In February 1988, Gerry was elected chairman of the Committee on Ecumenical and Interreligious Affairs in the National Conference of Catholic Bishops.

Bishop of Portland
On December 27, 1988, Pope John Paul II named Gerry as the tenth bishop of the Diocese of Portland.  Gerry was installed at the Cathedral of the Immaculate Conception in Portland, Maine, on February 21, 1989. In February 1989, Gerry published his book, Ever Present Lord.

During his 15-year-long tenure, Gerry published a pastoral letter approximately once a year, treating such topics as vocations to the ministry, the sacrament of confirmation, and human sexuality. He consolidated Maine parishes in Old Town, Lisbon, and Waterville. Gerry publicly opposed partial-birth abortion and physician-assisted suicide in state referendums in 1999 and 2000 respectively. Gerry opened St. Dominic Regional High School in Auburn, Maine, in 2002.

On March 9, 2002 Gerry removed two priests from ministry in the diocese.  The two men, Michael Doucette and John Audibert, had admitted to sexually abusing different boys during the 1980's.  Gerry said that the men would not be transferred to other parishes. On February 4, 2004, Gerry advised the Maine Legislature not to legalize same sex marriage, calling it a violation of "natural law".

Retirement 
On reaching the mandatory retirement age of 75, Gerry submitted his letter of resignation as bishop of Portland to Pope John Paul II in September 2003. His resignation was accepted on February 10, 2004, and he was succeeded by Bishop Joseph Malone.

Gerry then retired to Saint Anselm Abbey. After returning to the Abbey he briefly served as novice master for the community, supervising and guiding the novice monks in their formation.

See also
 

 Catholic Church hierarchy
 Catholic Church in the United States
 Historical list of the Catholic bishops of the United States
 List of Catholic bishops of the United States
 Lists of patriarchs, archbishops, and bishops

References

External links
Roman Catholic Diocese of Portland Official Site

Episcopal succession

1928 births
Living people
People from Millinocket, Maine
Saint Anselm College alumni
Fordham University alumni
American Benedictines
Benedictine abbots
Benedictine bishops
Roman Catholic Diocese of Manchester
Roman Catholic bishops of Portland
20th-century Roman Catholic bishops in the United States
21st-century Roman Catholic bishops in the United States
Religious leaders from New Hampshire
Saint Anselm College faculty
American expatriates in Canada